FIAR S.p.A. (Fabbrica Italiana Apparecchiature Radioelettriche) was an Italian avionics and radar manufacturer; the Eurofighter's current radar contains its technology.

History
It was formed on 31 July 1941, as a spin off from Compagnia Generale di Elettricità (CGE), and also known as CGE-FIAR. It made repeater transmitters for RAI (Radiotelevisione italiana), the national broadcasting company of Italy.

In the 1980s it formed the ELIRADAR consortium with SMA (Stato maggiore dell'Aeronautica Militare). It was a prime contractor for some avionics in the Panavia Tornado; Italy took a 15% share in the Panavia Aircraft project and planned to buy 100 of the aircraft.

Up until the late 1980s, it had only produced radars built under licence. The first radar that it developed itself was the Grifo. The company was Italy's leading manufacturer of radar and infrared homing technology, notably for the MIM-23 Hawk missile. It made airborne and precision approach radar.

Ownership
It was a division of Alenia Aeronautica (Alenia Difesa from 1994 to 2001), later bought by Finmeccanica.

Products

Radar systems
 CRESO ground surveillance radar
 ECR-90 (Euroradar CAPTOR), for the Eurofighter, contains the Grifo technology
 ELIRADAR APS-784, equips the AgustaWestland AW101
 EuroFIRST PIRATE (Passive Infrared Airborne Tracking Equipment, infrared homing for the Eurofighter)
 Grifetto
 Grifo (X band)
 Pointer
 Setter, look down radar (named after the dog)

Structure
It was headquartered in Lombardy in north-west Italy, with a factory in Baranzate near Bollate on the SP 233.

See also
 Microtecnica, former Italian avionics company

References

Italian companies established in 1941
Italian companies disestablished in 2003
Aircraft component manufacturers of Italy
Alenia Aeronautica
Companies based in Lombardy
Defunct manufacturing companies of Italy
Electronics companies established in 1941
Electronics companies disestablished in 2003
Radar manufacturers
Electronics companies of Italy